Anthonomus phyllocola is a weevil and a major pest of lodgepole pine (Pinus contorta) in Scandinavia.

Life history
Larvae develop in the male flowers of lodgepole pine.

References

Curculioninae
Conifer pathogens and diseases
Beetles of Europe